Foolish Wives is a 1922 American erotic silent drama film produced and distributed by Universal Pictures under their Super-Jewel banner and written and directed by Erich von Stroheim. The drama features von Stroheim, Rudolph Christians, Miss DuPont, Maude George, and others.

When released in 1922, the film was the most expensive film made at that time, and billed by Universal Studios as the "first million-dollar movie" to come out of Hollywood. Originally, von Stroheim intended the film to run anywhere between 6 and 10 hours, and be shown over two evenings, but Universal executives opposed this idea. The studio bosses cut the film drastically before the release date.

Foolish Wives, and the fulsome media coverage that added to its “sensational notoriety”, elevated von Stroheim into the ranks of preeminent directors of the early 1920s.

In 2008, Foolish Wives was selected for preservation in the United States National Film Registry by the Library of Congress as being "culturally, historically, or aesthetically significant."

Plot
The silent drama tells the story of a man who adopts the name and title of Count Wladislaw Sergius Karamzin (von Stroheim) to seduce rich women and extort money from them.

He has set up shop in Monte Carlo, and his partners in crime (and possible lovers) are his cousins: "Princess" Vera Petchnikoff (Busch) and "Her Highness" Olga Petchnikoff (George).

Count Karamzin begins his latest scam on the unworldly wife of an American envoy, Helen Hughes (DuPont), even though her husband is nearby. He attempts to charm her, planning to eventually fleece her of her money. She is easily impressed by his faux-aristocratic glamor, to the chagrin of her dull, but sincere, husband. Karamzin also has his eye on two other women, Maruschka (Fuller), a maid at the hotel, and Marietta (Polo), the mentally disabled daughter of one of his criminal associates (Gravina), seeing them both as easy sexual prey.

During the climax of the film Maruschka, the maid he has seduced and abandoned, goes mad and sets fire to a building in which Karamzin and Mrs. Hughes are trapped. To save himself, Karamzin jumps, leaving Mrs Hughes in danger. She is saved and looked after by her devoted husband. Karamzin's public displays of selfishness and cowardice ensure that he is shunned by the high society by whom he craves to be accepted. Humiliated, he tries to restore his pride by seducing Marietta, the mentally disabled girl. Her father kills him, dumping his body in a sewer. Karamzin's "cousins" are arrested for being imposters and con-artists.

Cast

 Rudolph Christians as Andrew J. Hughes, U.S. special-envoy to Monaco
 Miss DuPont as Helen Hughes, his wife
 Maude George as Her Highness Olga Petchnikoff
 Mae Busch as Princess Vera Petchnikoff
 Erich von Stroheim as Count Wladislaw Sergius Karamzin (Russian captain of Hussars)
 Dale Fuller as Maruschka, a maid
 Al Edmundson as Pavel Pavlich, a butler
 Cesare Gravina as Cesare Ventucci, a counterfeiter
 Malvina Polo as Marietta, his half-witted daughter
 C. J. Allen as Albert I, Prince of Monaco
 Louise Emmons as Mother Garoupe (uncredited)
 Nigel De Brulier as Monk (uncredited)
 Agnes Emerson in Bit Role
 Harrison Ford as Rude Soldier/Armless Soldier (uncredited)
 Valerie Germonprez as an Extra (uncredited)
 Mrs. Kent as Dr. Judd's Wife (uncredited)
 Mme. Kopetzky as an Actress
 Mary Philbin as Crippled Girl (uncredited)
 Edward Reinach as Monaco Secretary of State (uncredited)
 Louis K. Webb as Dr. Judd (uncredited)

Cast notes
Robert Edeson replaced Rudolph Christians as Andrew J. Hughes when Christians died during production. Edeson was filmed entirely from the back.

Background

When von Stroheim prepared to embark on his third project with Universal Pictures, he was basking in the accolades earned from his back-to-back successes with Blind Husbands (1919) and The Devil's Pass Key (1920).

When his Universal contract expired, von Stroheim was aggressively sought after by the major film studios. Universal's vice-president and publicity director, R. H. Cochrane, eager to retain their “new discovery”, agreed to a substantial increase in von Stroheim's remuneration. Producer Laemmle was outraged when he discovered Cochrane's largess, but acquiesced to a fait accompli. Set construction on the Universal back lot was already underway by 6 April 1920, before von Stroheim had renegotiated and signed the contract.

Universal's most  “lavish and ambitious project” to date, Foolish Wives was conceived by Carl Laemmle and reflected an industry-wide trend towards elaborate productions in a bid to lure moviegoers with “spectacle, melodrama and sex.”

Production

The working title for the picture was Monte Carlo, referring to Europe's gambling mecca and the setting for von Stroheim's  “clash of American and European ideals in post-war Europe” revisiting his themes from previous films.

Universal built enormous facade-facsimiles of the French Riviera’s most exclusive casino and entertainment complex. A separate set was constructed on the Monterey Peninsula, located 300 miles north of Universal Studios, providing panoramic views of the Pacific Ocean that resembled the Mediterranean coast along the French Riviera. The almost “inaccessible” site atop Point Lopus was subject to severe weather, resulting in extensive and costly damage to the stage sets.

Von Strohiem and his cadre of highly competent and loyal technicians increasingly prioritized the production of Foolish Wives at the expense of other Universal projects, effectively “taking over the studio.” Carl Lemaelle promoted the  20-year-old producer Irving Thalberg to head of production and tasked him with bringing von Stroheim's extravagant consumption of studio resources under control.

Thalberg, an able administrator and skilled at taking the measure of movie directors, presented von Stroheim with a scheme to expedite the completion of the film, reminding him he was contractually bound to submit to the production manager directives. Anticipating this contretemps, von Stroheim defiantly rejected Thalberg's authority: “Remove me as the director and you remove me as the star, and you don’t have a picture.”  Von Stroheim resumed filming on his own terms. This film marks the onset of Erich von Stroheim's reputation as a "perfectionist" who, for the sake of "authenticity", insisted upon extravagance and costly sets and shooting schedules for his films.

Universals' publicity department reacted to the reports of massive cost overruns by presenting them as virtues. The public was subjected to advertising stunts that cheerfully enumerated von Stroheim's directorial eccentricities and excesses, real or imagined. One true story demonstrates the director's penchant for realistic artifacts, in which facsimile 1000 franc notes used in the casino sequences had been ordered manufactured by photoengrave technique—a counterfeiting method. Treasury Department officials were alerted and promptly took von Stroheim and the engravers into custody, then released them. The matter was finally resolved after protracted litigation.

The extravagant spending on Foolish Wives proceeded unabated when von Stroheim travelled to Point Lopus to shoot the coastal scenes and those requiring continuity linkage with shots made at Universal's backlot. Freed from any direct supervision by Universal executives at this remote location, von Stroheim improvised by adding to the script, incurring costly delays and added overtime expenditures. Alarmed at these excesses, Thalberg summarily cut all direct funding to the Point Lopus operation. Von Stroheim responded by arranging all expenses to be charged to the studio and continued shooting.

On 7 February 1921 actor Rudolf Christians who played one of the central roles in Foolish Wives, died unexpectedly. A dreaded calamity in a film that was so advanced in production, several key scenes with Christians’ character remained to be filmed. Von Stroheim was unable to discover any satisfying or convincing cinematic technique to compensate for the loss despite enlisting a double for the deceased Christians. When von Strohiem proposed a major reshooting of the film with Christians’ look-alike stand-in Robert Edeson, Thalberg emphatically rejected it and ordered that camera and equipment be collected and returned to the studio. The filming phase of Foolish Wives was terminated on 15 June 1921.

In the summer of 1921, von Stroheim and his staff began the arduous process of editing the 326,000 feet of bulk footage from which Foolish Wives would be carved. Superfluous material was eliminated (retakes, duplicates, damaged footage), leaving von Stroheim with about 150,000 feet with which to craft his story.

During the editing phase, Universal became alarmed when the Fatty Arbuckle sexual indiscretions were targeted by the movie tabloids,  Foolish Wives and its romantic intrigue and lurid sexual overtones threatened to link the film in the public mind to these scandals. To dispel concerns among official censors and counter negative public reaction, Universal organized all expense paid trips to the upscale Beverly Hills Hotel for the assembled censors to view an all-night rough-cut screening of Foolish Wives, presented on 18 August 1921. The guests were urged to identify objectionable scenes that might be removed before general distribution. An outraged Stroheim protested, demanding that the 17,000 foot work be released as is, but shown on two consecutive nights, Universal summarily removed him from any further role in the editing.

In preparation for the film's premiere, Foolish Wives passed through the hands of several Universal editorial employees in order to bring the footage from 30 reels down to studio 14 reels. By the end of November, the picture had been reduced to 18 reels. In order to meet the 11 January 1922 premiere deadline, a special train carriage with cutting apparatus was provided so that team of editors could complete the cutting en route from Hollywood to New York.

Post-Production
A 3 ½ hour and approximately 14,000 foot Foolish Wives premiered at New York's Central Theatre on 11 January 1922. Following the showing, Universal cut a further 3500 feet in order to comply with the New York State Censorship Board This 10-reel print was the format released to general audiences.

In 1928, Universal subjected the film to a major overhaul as part of a general reissue “completely restructuring the narrative and changing the names and descriptions of the characters.” In 1936 the Museum of Modern Art obtained a copy of this 7655 foot 1928 cut, believing it was the general release version distributed in 1922 and presenting it as such to museum audiences.

Reception

The film was the eighth most popular movie of 1922 in North America.

Critical response
When released, the staff at Variety, in their review of the film, concentrated on the film's expensive costs and von Stroheim's involvement. They wrote "According to the Universal's press department, the picture cost $1,103,736.38; was 11 months and six days in filming; six months in assembling and editing; consumed 320,000 feet of negative, and employed as many as 15,000 extras for atmosphere. Foolish Wives shows the cost – in the sets, beautiful backgrounds and massive interiors that carry a complete suggestion of the atmosphere of Monte Carlo, the locale of the story. And the sets, together with a thoroughly capable cast, are about all the picture has for all the heavy dough expended. Obviously intended to be a sensational sex melodrama, Foolish Wives is at the same time frankly salacious ... Erich von Stroheim wrote the script, directed, and is the featured player. He's all over the lot every minute."

While praising the acting as excellent, Photoplay called the film "an insult to American ideals and womanhood".

In 1994, film critic Ed Gonzalez discussed the film and wrote "1922's Foolish Wives begins with the perfect iris shot. This is no ordinary 'fade into' effect, but an entrancing reinforcement of the sinister, insular and constrictive nature of the milieu Von Stroheim is about to introduce us to ... At the time of its release, Foolish Wives was the most expensive film ever produced, and though Von Stroheim was widely considered a lavish spendthrift, his films remain triumphs of period detail."

In 2008, critic Keith Phipps wrote "Foolish Wives re-creates Monte Carlo in a Hollywood back lot ... Playing a fraudulent aristocrat, in a touch that echoed his own biography, Von Stroheim dupes the gullible, lusts after a retarded teenager, and attempts to undo an innocent American. It's like a Henry James novel as dreamt by a pornographer, and it illustrates what makes Von Stroheim such a problematic genius: Is it nascent post-modernism or egotism run amok that made him prominently feature a character reading a novel called Foolish Wives, credited to Erich Von Stroheim?"

On Rotten Tomatoes, Foolish Wives has an approval rating of 89% based on 9 reviews.

Footnotes

Sources

Further reading

External links

Foolish Wives essay by Daniel Eagan at National Film Registry 

 
 
 
  (black and white)
  (monochrome colored)
 Foolish Wives film review at Pop Matters by Violet Glaze

1922 films
1922 drama films
1920s color films
1920s erotic drama films
American silent feature films
American black-and-white films
Films set in Monaco
American erotic drama films
Adultery in films
Films about gambling
Universal Pictures films
Films directed by Erich von Stroheim
United States National Film Registry films
Articles containing video clips
1920s American films
Silent American drama films